Jack Walrath Quintet at Umbria Jazz Festival, Vol. 2 is a live album by trumpeter Jack Walrath which was recorded at the Umbria Jazz Festival in 1983, and released on the Italian Red label in 1985.

Reception

The AllMusic review by Scott Yanow stated, "The second of two albums recorded by trumpeter Jack Walrath's quintet is at the same level as the first. The music is well-played and adventurous but does not stick in one's mind afterwards; in general it is easier to respect than to love, making this series of greater interest to Jack Walrath completists rather than more general listeners".

Track listing
All compositions by Jack Walrath
 "Feel No Evil" – 16:50
 "A Plea for Sanity" – 11:30
 "Inchen" – 15:00
 "Mucene the Genii" – 10:35

Personnel
Jack Walrath – trumpet 
Glenn Ferris – trombone
Michael Cochrane – piano
Anthony Cox – bass 
Mike Clark – drums

References

Red Records live albums
Jack Walrath live albums
1985 live albums